Key Falls, is a 50 ft (38 m) waterfall located near Brevard, in the Blue Ridge Mountains of North Carolina.

Geology 
Key Falls is a waterfall with a watershed located on an unnamed tributary of the French Broad River.  The creek trickles over a series of rocks before continuing on to the French Broad River a few hundred yards downstream.

Visiting Key Falls 
The falls is on private property, but the owners allow public access to the falls.  The property is owned by Key Falls Inn, a Victorian-style bed and breakfast.

To view the falls, beginning at the intersection of on U.S. Highway 276, U.S. Highway 64, and NC Highway 280 in Brevard, travel east on US 64 for 3.5 miles.  Turn right on Crab Creek Road and travel 1.5 miles.  Turn right on Everett Road.  Travel 2.8 miles to the driveway for the entrance to Key Falls Inn on the left.  You can turn into the Inn's driveway, park, and walk the short path to the falls.

Nearby falls 
Triple Falls
High Falls
Hooker Falls
Bridal Veil Falls
Wintergreen Falls
Connestee Falls and Batson Creek Falls
Glen Cannon Falls
Turley Falls

References

External links 
Key Falls Inn

Waterfalls of Transylvania County, North Carolina
Waterfalls of North Carolina
Tourist attractions in Transylvania County, North Carolina